Noémie Schmidt (born 18 November 1990) is a Swiss actress, most notable for her television and film work, including Henrietta of England in Versailles (2015–2017). Her role in The Student and Mister Henri (2015) won her the Prix Premiers Rendez-vous (Best Newcomer) at the 2016 Cabourg Film Festival and a nomination for the César Award for Most Promising Actress the same year.

Her other work includes For This Is My Body (2015) and Radin! (2016) and the television films Daddy's Little Girl (2014) and Le premier été (2014).

Early life and youth
The daughter of a lawyer and a biologist, Schmidt became interested in performing at an early age. From 2004 to 2008 she sang in the choir of the Schola de Sion (in Valais, Switzerland), developing her vocal technique and training in classical singing. After a trip to the United States, she moved to Brussels where she studied theatre at the Lassaad International School of Theatre, and gave singing lessons to children at the Théâtre Royal de la Monnaie.

Career
She made her screen debut in 2012, in a short film by Ewa Brykalska entitled Coda. Her performance was praised and she won several prizes in festivals dedicated to short films. Noticed for her talent, she turned to television in 2013 with Toi que j'aimais tant by Mary Higgins Clark, followed by Le premier été of Marion Sarraut, in 2014.

That year, she made her cinema debut in the feature film La Fille sûre by Victor Emmanuel Boinem. She then won the title role of The Student and Mister Henri, in 2015, alongside Claude Brasseur. The film earned her a nomination for the César Award for Most Promising Actress, and won her the Prix Premiers Rendez-vous (Best Newcomer) at the 2016 Cabourg Film Festival. That same year, she portrayed Henrietta of England in the series Versailles (2015-) on Canal+.

In 2016, she starred in the French comedy film Radin! by Fred Cavayé, alongside Dany Boon, Laurence Arné, and Patrick Ridremont.

Filmography

Film"IMDB: Noémie Schmidt" 
 2012 : Coda, short film by Ewa Brykalska : la fille
 2013 : Dolça, short film by Laure Bourdon Zarader : Dolça
 2014 : Julia, short film by Maud Neve and Nora Burlet : Élise
 2014 : Locanda, short film by Lucas Pannatier : Lily
 2014 : La Vie devant soi by Victor-Emmanuel Boinem : Charlotte
 2015 : The Student and Mister Henri by Ivan Calbérac : Constance Piponnier
 2016 : Radin! by Fred Cavayé : Laura
 2016 : For this is my body by Paule Muret
 2018 : The Awakening of Motti Wolkenbruch
 2019 : Paris Is Us

Television 
 2013 : Toi que j'aimais tant by Olivier Langlois : Pauline
 2014 : Le premier été by Marion Sarraut : Angélique adolescente
 2015 : Versailles, series by Simon Mirren and David Wolstencroft : Henrietta of England
 2016 : La llum d'Elna by Sílvia Quer :  Élisabeth Eidenbenz
 2018 :  À l'intérieur, series by Bruno Dega and Jeanne Le Guillou : Angèle Maury

Theatre 
 2003 : Ubu roi : la mère Ubuننز

Awards 
 2013 : special mention by the jury at the Festival Premiers Plans d'Angers for Coda
 2013 : female performance award at the Un festival c'est trop court ! (Festival européen du court métrage de Nice) for Coda 
 2013 : female performance award at the Festival Côté court de Pantin for Coda
 2016 : prize for best newcomer at the Cabourg Film Festival for L'Étudiante et Monsieur Henri

References

External links

 

Living people
1990 births
21st-century Swiss actresses
Swiss film actresses
Swiss television actresses
People from Sion, Switzerland